Prehistoric Indian Village, also known as Arant's Field, is a historic archaeological site located near St. Matthews, Calhoun County, South Carolina. This site was occupied in the Archaic Period, probably by small groups of hunter-gatherers. During the first millennium AD, a large agricultural community was situated in the area, with a tentative date of occupation of ca. 500 AD.

It was listed in the National Register of Historic Places in 1974.

References

Archaeological sites on the National Register of Historic Places in South Carolina
National Register of Historic Places in Calhoun County, South Carolina